Richard Church may refer to:

Richard Church (general) (1784–1873), Irish military officer in the British and Greek army
Richard William Church (1815–1890), nephew of the general, Dean of St Paul's
Richard Church (poet) (1893–1972), English poet and man of letters
Richard Church (MP), Member of Parliament (MP) for Ipswich in 1402